Lissoclinum is a genus of tunicates.

Taxonomy
Lissoclinum contains the following species:

 Lissoclinum argyllense
 Lissoclinum triangulum
 Lissoclinum cavum
 Lissoclinum nebulosum
 Lissoclinum taratara
 Lissoclinum tasmanense
 Lissoclinum vareau
 Lissoclinum variabile
 Lissoclinum abdominale
 Lissoclinum agriculum
 Lissoclinum aureum
 Lissoclinum calycis
 Lissoclinum durabile
 Lissoclinum levitum
 Lissoclinum ravarava
 Lissoclinum reginum
 Lissoclinum roseum
 Lissoclinum rubrum
 Lissoclinum spongium
 Lissoclinum stellatum
 Lissoclinum textrinum
 Lissoclinum timorense
 Lissoclinum tuheiavae
 Lissoclinum verrilli
 Lissoclinum vulgare
 Lissoclinum violaceum
 Lissoclinum bilobatum
 Lissoclinum bistratum
 Lissoclinum badium
 Lissoclinum marpum
 Lissoclinum mereti
 Lissoclinum midui
 Lissoclinum multitestis
 Lissoclinum wandeli
 Lissoclinum notti
 Lissoclinum weigelei
 Lissoclinum scopulosum
 Lissoclinum sente
 Lissoclinum textile
 Lissoclinum branchiatus
 Lissoclinum caliginosum
 Lissoclinum capense
 Lissoclinum caulleryi
 Lissoclinum coactum
 Lissoclinum conchylium
 Lissoclinum cornutum
 Lissoclinum diversum
 Lissoclinum japonicum
 Lissoclinum karenae
 Lissoclinum limosum
 Lissoclinum maculatum
 Lissoclinum pacificense
 Lissoclinum polyorchis
 Lissoclinum punctatum
 Lissoclinum ostrearium
 Lissoclinum triforme
 Lissoclinum tunicatum
 Lissoclinum fragile
 Lissoclinum perforatum
 Lissoclinum laneum
 Lissoclinum patella
 Lissoclinum clavatum

References

Aplousobranchia